The 1992 PBA season was the 18th season of the Philippine Basketball Association (PBA).

Executive committee 
 Reynaldo G. Marquez (Commissioner)
 Luis Lorenzo, Sr. (Chairman, representing Pepsi Hotshots)
 Wilfred Steven Uytengsu (Vice Chairman, representing Alaska Milkmen)
 Lance Gokongwei (Treasurer, representing Presto Tivolis)

Teams

Season highlights
PBA Commissioner Rudy Salud stepped down from his post to become the campaign manager of Danding Cojuangco for the upcoming presidential elections. League chairman Rey Marquez succeeded Atty. Salud as the new PBA Commissioner.
The pre-season annual PBA draft was highly anticipated with six members of the national team that took home the basketball gold in the recent Southeast Asian Games joining the rookie draft. Five-time national player Zandro "Jun" Limpot appealed earlier to PBA commissioner Rudy Salud that he'l be allowed to enter the PBA draft despite a league rule prohibited a player younger than 23 years old to play in the league. The PBA board of governors has rejected Jun Limpot's request. 
Purefoods Tender Juicy Hotdogs won the four-team PBA battle of champions from January 26 – February 2, which includes the Chinese national team. The other two teams that participated are last year's third conference champion Alaska Milkmen and Swift Mighty Meaty Hotdogs, taking the spot from last year's first conference champion Ginebra San Miguel.
League mourns the passing of the great sportscaster Joe Cantada, who succumbed to cancer in the United States on March 22.
The PBA's playing venue, the ULTRA was renamed NASA, now controlled by the Philippine Sports Commission (PSC). By the end of the year, the league left the Pasig Arena after eight years. The PBA transferred to the newly built Cuneta Astrodome in Pasay the following season.
The PBA suffered in gate attendance with lean crowds watching the games during the All-Filipino, among several factors were the absence of crowd-drawer Ginebra San Miguel from the semifinals and the deteriorating venue. The league introduced the Whiplash dancers during halftime to entertain the fans watching live. 
The league's first NBA-styled coliseum announcer, Vince St. Price, made his debut during the All-Filipino Conference finals. He became the regular venue announcer for the league's second game during doubleheaders.
Swift Mighty Meaties found an import named Tony Harris, known as the "Hurricane", Harris broke all sorts of record for the most points scored in a single game by scoring 105 points in Swift's 151-147 win against Ginebra on October 10, 1992, in Iloilo City. He was easily the unanimous choice for the best import award and led Swift Mighty Meaties to their first-ever PBA championship. Swift coach Yeng Guiao won his first title as a head mentor.
Presto Ice Cream, one of the two remaining pioneers in the PBA, played its final season. The Gokongwei franchise had earlier signed former grandslam coach and the comebacking Tommy Manotoc to replace coach Jimmy Mariano on the bench before the start of the third conference. The team won just once in their final conference and formally bid goodbye and played their last game on November 5, losing to 7-Up. The ballclub was sold to Sta.Lucia Realty just before Christmas Eve on December 1992.

Opening ceremonies
The muses for the participating teams are as follows:

Champions
 First Conference: Shell Rimula-X Zoomers
 All-Filipino Conference: San Miguel Beermen
 Third Conference: Swift Mighty Meaty Hotdogs
 Team with best win–loss percentage: Swift Mighty Meaty Hotdogs (43-26, .623)
 Best Team of the Year: San Miguel Beermen (3rd)

First Conference

Elimination round

Semifinal round

Third place playoffs 

|}

Finals results

|}
Best Import of the Conference: Bobby Parks (Shell)

All-Filipino Conference

Elimination round

Semifinal round

Third place playoffs 

|}

Finals

|}

Third Conference

Elimination round

Semifinal round

Third place playoffs 

|}

Finals

|}
Best Import of the Conference: Tony Harris (Swift)

Awards
 Most Valuable Player: Ato Agustin (San Miguel)
 Rookie of the Year: Bong Ravena (San Miguel)
 Most Improved Player: Pido Jarencio (Ginebra)
 Mythical Five:
Al Solis (Swift)
Ato Agustin (San Miguel)
Ramon Fernandez (San Miguel)
Alvin Patrimonio (Purefoods)
Nelson Asaytono (Swift)
 Mythical Second Team:
Ronnie Magsanoc (Shell)
Elmer Cabahug (Purefoods)
Benjie Paras (Shell)
Jerry Codiñera (Purefoods)
Alvin Teng (San Miguel)
 All-Defensive Team:
Jerry Codiñera (Purefoods)
Glenn Capacio (Purefoods)
Alvin Teng (San Miguel)
Art dela Cruz (San Miguel)
Chito Loyzaga (Ginebra)

Cumulative standings

References

1992 PBA season